"Up the Down Steroid" is the second episode in the eighth season of the American animated television series South Park, and the 113th episode of the series overall. Going by production order, it is the second episode of Season 8 instead of 3rd. It originally aired on Comedy Central in the United States on March 24, 2004. In the episode, Jimmy enters the special Olympics but starts using steroids to improve his performance. Cartman, believing he will have an advantage over the other children, disguises himself as handicapped so he can enter and win the cash prize. The title of the episode is a parody of the book Up the Down Staircase.

Plot
Timmy and Jimmy, two of the most hated each other frenemies, are eager to represent Team USA at the 2004 World Kids Disability Games in Denver. Cartman decides to fake being disabled and attempt to beat all the handicapped children in the events to win the $1,000 prize. Jimmy is talked into taking steroids by Nathan to increase his chances of winning. He manages to keep his use of it a secret from everyone except for Timmy (who discovers the drugs after he accidentally dropped the bag and spilling the contents). While Timmy frowns on this, being unable to say anything other than either his own and Jimmy's names, he is unable to explain the situation to the school counselor Mr. Mackey.

Jimmy begins to neglect his girlfriend and studies as a result of his steroid use. When his girlfriend grows tired of neglect and announces she is leaving him, Jimmy flies into a steroid rage and savagely attacks his girlfriend and mother. Kyle repeatedly tries to talk Cartman out of his plans but is ignored. Soon, he was good at losing in all the events and never actually won a medal. At the closing ceremonies, the prizes are given by Mark McGwire, Jason Giambi and Barry Bonds. Jimmy sets multiple records and was named the 2004 games' "Special Olympian", winning the $1,000 prize in the process. Cartman, on the other hand, is so out-of-shape that his plan fails miserably when the more athletic disabled contestants beat him; he nevertheless wins a "spirit award"—consisting of a gift certificate for Shakey's Pizza for $50—for coming last. When he goes to collect the prize, Jimmy recognizes Cartman and is about to attack him, but Timmy intervenes, and Jimmy realises that he is just as much of a cheater himself. Jimmy confesses his drug use to the crowd and returns his medal, asking for his records to be cancelled and that people who use steroids are "pussies" (all the while the camera focuses on McGwire, Giambi, and Bonds during his speech). Jimmy bumps into McGuire, who said to him that he was good for himself for being honest. Cartman then claims to Stan and Kyle that he pretended to be handicapped in order for Jimmy to learn his lesson, but Stan and Kyle don't buy his lies; in anger, Cartman calls them "assholes" and tells them to "grow up."

Production
There was some controversy surrounding "Up the Down Steroid" and the 2005 film The Ringer, as both feature the same plot: someone pretending to be disabled in order to compete in the Special Olympics. According to the episode's DVD audio commentary, series co-creators Trey Parker and Matt Stone did not think that they ripped off The Ringer, since the idea to them did not seem hard to come up with, and they did not even think it was big enough for a twenty-minute episode let alone a two-hour film.

In the opening scene, the boys are playing the same "Investigative Reports with Bill Kurtis" funtime game as they did in the season four episode "Cartman Joins NAMBLA".

The episode's title refers to the 1964 young adult novel, Up the Down Staircase, by Bel Kaufman, which was adapted into a film in 1967 starring Sandy Dennis. Trey Parker admitted he had to perform this story in a high school play and hated it. Additionally, Stone admitted in the commentary that he once pretended to be disabled to get into Six Flags Magic Mountain for half price.

Home media
"Up the Down Steroid", along with the thirteen other episodes from South Parks eighth season, was released on a three-disc DVD set in the United States on August 29, 2006. The set includes brief audio commentaries by Parker and Stone for each episode. Up the Down Steroid was also released as part of The Cult of Cartman, a 2008 DVD compilation of Cartman-centric episodes.

References

External links 
 "Up the Down Steroid" Full episode at South Park Studios
 

Barry Bonds
Denver in fiction
Doping in sport
South Park (season 8) episodes
Special Olympics
Television episodes about drugs
Television episodes about disability